Malacothamnus parishii is a species of flowering plant in the mallow family known by the common name Parish's bushmallow. It is endemic to San Bernardino County, California, where it is confirmed from only a single collection from 1895. It has a California Rare Plant Rank of 1A (Plants presumed extirpated in California and either rare or extinct elsewhere). Malacothamnus parishii is occasionally treated within Malacothamnus fasciculatus.

References

External links
Calflora Profile: Malacothamnus parishii
'' Photo gallery at Calphotos

Flora of California
Endemic flora of California
parishii
Natural history of San Bernardino County, California
Flora without expected TNC conservation status